Commodores 13 is the tenth studio album (and thirteenth overall, including two greatest-hits compilations and a live album) by the Commodores, released in 1983 on Motown Records. It's also the first album by the band after the departure of Lionel Richie, who began his solo career in 1982.

Background
Commodores 13 was produced by William King, Thomas McClary, Walter Orange and Milan Williams. Singers Vesta Williams and Melissa Manchester made guest appearances on the album.

Track listing

Side one
"I'm in Love" (Harold Hudson, Shirley King, William King) – 4:05
"Turn Off the Lights" (Shirley King, William King) – 4:20
"Nothing Like a Woman" (Hudson, Walter Orange) – 4:56
"Captured" (Linda McClary, Thomas McClary) – 4:37

Side two
"Touchdown" (Michael Dunlap, Orange) – 4:30
"Welcome Home" (Bill Champlin, Thomas McClary) – 4:20
"Ooo, Woman You" (Melissa Manchester, Thomas McClary) – 4:22
"Only You" (Milan Williams) – 4:10

Personnel 
Commodores
 Harold Hudson – lead vocals (1, 2, 6), vocal arrangements (1, 2, 3), rhythm arrangements (1, 2, 3), backing vocals (2), additional keyboards (3)
 William King – vocal arrangements (1, 2), rhythm arrangements (1, 2), synthesizers (2, 3, 4, 6, 7), horns (2, 4, 5, 6, 8)
 Ronald LaPread – bass guitar (2, 3, 4, 6, 7, 8), vocal arrangements (3)
 Thomas McClary – lead guitar (2, 3, 5, 7, 8), rhythm guitar (2, 3, 5, 7, 8), acoustic guitar (4), electric guitar (4), rhythm arrangements (4, 6, 7), vocal arrangements (4, 6, 7), string arrangements (4, 6), horn arrangements (4, 6), guitar solo (6), lead vocals (7)
 Walter Orange – drums (1-8), lead vocals (3, 4, 5, 8), rhythm arrangements (3, 5), vocal arrangements (5)
 Milan Williams – keyboards (2-7), acoustic piano (8), Fender Rhodes (8), Oberheim synthesizer (8), rhythm arrangements (8), vocal arrangements (8), horn arrangements (8), string arrangements (8)

Additional musicians
 Michael Boddicker – acoustic piano (1), Fender Rhodes (1), synthesizers (1), synth bass (1), synth horns (6), synth strings (6), additional synthesizers (7)
 David Cochrane – backing vocals (1-7), synthesizers (5, 7), vocoder (5), additional guitar (8)
 Bill Champlin – backing vocals (1, 3-8), vocal arrangements (6), acoustic piano (6), Fender Rhodes (6), synth bass (6)
 Michael Dunlap – additional guitar (3, 5), additional keyboards (5), rhythm arrangements (5), rhythm guitar (6), Moog synthesizer (7)
 Geno Findley – additional synthesizers (7)
 Michael Lang – additional keyboards (8)
 Paul Jackson Jr. – additional guitar (8)
 John Gilston – Simmons drums (7)
 Steve Schaeffer – additional drums (8)
 Paulinho da Costa – percussion (1, 3, 6, 7), effects (3)
 Rolene Marie Naveja – castanets (3)
 Bruce Miller – horn arrangements (1, 2, 3, 5, 8), string arrangements (1, 2, 3, 5, 8)
 Shirley King – rhythm arrangements (2), vocal arrangements (2)
 Gene Page – string arrangements (4), horn arrangements (4)
 Benjamin White – string arrangements (7)
 Phyllis St. James – backing vocals (1)
 Deborah Thomas – backing vocals (2, 4, 6, 7)
 Tandia Brenda White – backing vocals (5)
 Vesta Williams – backing vocals (5, 6, 8)
 Melissa Manchester – backing vocals (7)

Production 
 Producers – William King (Tracks 1 & 2), Walter Orange (Tracks 3 & 5), Thomas McClary (Tracks 4, 6 & 7), Milan Williams (Track 8).
 Executive Recording and Mixing Engineer – Jane Clark
 Second Recording – Brian Leshon
 Additional Recording, Second Recording and Additional Mixing – Magic Moreno
 Additional Mixing – Norman Whitfield
 Mastering – Bernie Grundman
 Recorded and Mastered at A&M Studios, Hollywood, California.
 Mixed at Motown/Hitsville U.S.A. Recording Studios, Hollywood, California and The Village Recorder, West Los Angeles, California.
 Project Manager – Suzee Ikeda
 Art Direction – Terry Taylor 
 Photography – Mark Sennet

Charts

References

Commodores albums
1983 albums
Motown albums
Albums recorded at A&M Studios